Rob Prosser (born 8 July 1964) is a former Australian rules football player, who played two games for the Sydney Swans in 1985.

In 1987, he was recruited by VFA club Springvale, and was a member of its 1987 premiership team.

References

1964 births
Living people
Sydney Swans players
Casey Demons players
Australian players of Australian rules football
Place of birth missing (living people)